Togo is divided into five regions (régions, singular région) (capitals in parentheses):

The regions are divided into 30 prefectures.

See also
List of Togolese regions by Human Development Index
Prefectures of Togo
ISO 3166-2:TG

References

 
Togo 1
Regions, Togo
Togo, Regions
Subdivisions of Togo
Togo geography-related lists